Guerino Bertocchi (October 29, 1907 – April 13, 1981) was an Italian mechanic and racing driver known for his lifelong association with Maserati.

Bertocchi debuted as a mechanic and co-driver alongside Alfieri Maserati in the 1926 Targa Florio. In 1947 he was promoted to the role of chief mechanic and test driver of the Maserati Formula One team, as well as testing road cars like the 5000 GT. In 1957 he ran the car that gave Juan Manuel Fangio his fifth and final world title. Bertocchi's only Formula One entry is the 1954 Spanish Grand Prix as a reserve driver. However, all Maserati-drivers started the race and Bertocchi never entered a Formula One race again. Between 1931 and 1963 he competed thirteen times in the Mille Miglia, once in the Targa Florio, once in the 12 Hours of Pescara and once in the 24 Hours of Le Mans.

Complete results

References
 Guerino Bertocchi (I) - Complete Archive - Racing Sports Cars
 http://www.maserati-indy.co.uk/alfieri70.htm

1907 births
1981 deaths
Italian racing drivers
Mille Miglia drivers
24 Hours of Le Mans drivers
Formula One mechanics
Italian motorsport people
Maserati people